Jeremiah O'Sullivan (February 6, 1842 – August 10, 1896) was an Irish-born clergyman of the Roman Catholic Church who served as Bishop of Mobile from 1885 until his death in 1896.

Biography
Jeremiah O'Sullivan was born in Kanturk, County Cork, to John and Mary (née Ahern) O'Sullivan. He came to the United States in 1863, and entered St. Charles College in Ellicott City, Maryland. After completing his classical course, he made his theological studies at St. Mary's Seminary in Baltimore. He was ordained to the priesthood by Archbishop Martin John Spalding on June 30, 1868.

His first assignment was as a curate under Rev. Placide Louis Chapelle at St. Peter's Church in Rockville. He then served as a pastor in Westernport for nine years. During his time in Westernport, he erected a church and a convent for the Sisters of St. Joseph, under whose direction he placed the parochial school. He was afterwards sent to Washington, D.C., where he served as pastor of St. Peter's Church.

On June 16, 1885, O'Sullivan was appointed the fourth Bishop of Mobile, Alabama, by Pope Leo XIII. He received his episcopal consecration on the following September 20 from Archbishop James Gibbons, with Bishops John Joseph Keane and Henry P. Northrop serving as co-consecrators, at St. Peter's Church. His installation took place in Mobile on November 1 of that year. A gifted administrator, he was successful in restoring the financial status of the diocese. He also established several new churches, chapels, and schools, and oversaw the addition of two towers to the Cathedral of the Immaculate Conception.

O'Sullivan died at age 54, and is buried in the crypt of Immaculate Conception Cathedral.

References

Episcopal succession

19th-century Irish people
1842 births
1896 deaths
Irish emigrants to the United States (before 1923)
People from County Cork
19th-century Roman Catholic bishops in the United States
Roman Catholic bishops of Mobile
People from Westernport, Maryland
Catholics from Maryland